Salvatore "Salvo" Randone (25 September 1906 – 6 March 1991) was an Italian theatrical, television and film actor.

Born in Syracuse, Sicily, Randone debuted on stage in mid-1920s and, after some years in which he played roles of little weight, he became in the fifties one of the most critically appreciated actors in Italian theatre.  After a few minor roles in 1940s and 1950s he started in early 1960s a quite prolific film career as character actor; for his performances he was awarded with two Silver Ribbons and a grolla d'oro. Randone appeared in 45 films between 1943 and 1977. He was also very prolific as television actor, starring in some TV-series of great success. He was married to the actress Neda Naldi.

Selected filmography

 Sant'Elena, piccola isola (1943) - General Gourgaud
 Cuore (1948)
 Letter at Dawn (1948) - Donati - Defense attorney
 The Bigamist (1956)
 Vento del sud (1959)
 The Assassin (1961) - Commissioner Palumbo
 Rome 1585 (1961) - Pope Sixtus V
 Black City (1962) - The bishop
 Salvatore Giuliano (1962) - President of Viterbo Assize Court
 I giorni contati (1962) - Cesare Conversi
 Roaring Years (1962) - The antifascist
 Night Train to Milan (1962) - Conductor
 Family Diary (1962) - Salocchi
 The Girl from Parma (1963) - Scipio Pagliughi
 The Verona Trial (1963) - Andrea Fortunato - Public Prosecutor
 Hands Over the City (1963) - De Angelis
 Un marito in condominio (1963) - Salvatore Carcaterra
 Castle of Blood (1964) - Lester
 The Magnificent Cuckold (1964) - Belisario
 The Possessed (1965) - Enrico
 The 10th Victim (1965) - Professor
 Les Combinards (1966) - Raffaele Caccamo
 Me, Me, Me... and the Others (1966) - Traveller with a menu
 We Still Kill the Old Way (1967) - Prof. Roscio
 No Diamonds for Ursula (1967) - Spiros
 Spirits of the Dead (1968) - Priest (segment "Toby Dammit")
 L'età del malessere (1968)
 Machine Gun McCain (1969) - Don Salvatore
 Fellini Satyricon (1969) - Eumolpo
 Investigation of a Citizen Above Suspicion (1970) - Plumber
 The Swinging Confessors (1970) - Don Clemente
 Ninì Tirabusciò: la donna che inventò la mossa (1970)
 Gang War (1971) - Nicola 'Nicky' Manzano
 The Working Class Goes to Heaven (1971) - Militina
 Stress (1971)
 My Dear Killer (1972) - Chief Marò
 Chronicle of a Homicide (1972) - General attorney
 La prima notte di quiete (1972) - The Head Teacher
 Il caso Pisciotta (1972) - Don Ferdinando Cusimano
 La calandria (1972) - Calandro
 The Infamous Column (1972) - Settala
 Property Is No Longer a Theft (1973) - Total's Father
 Shoot First, Die Later (1974) - Malacarne
 In the Name of the Pope King (1977) - Black Pope

References

External links

1906 births
1991 deaths
Italian male film actors
Nastro d'Argento winners
20th-century Italian male actors
Actors from Sicily